The Girl on the Train may refer to:

 The Girl on the Train (novel), a 2015 novel by Paula Hawkins
 The Girl on the Train (2016 film), an American film based on the novel
 The Girl on the Train (2021 film), an Indian film, remake of the US 2016 film
 The Girl on the Train (2009 film), a French drama film
 The Girl on the Train (2013 film), an American independent film

See also
 The Girl in the Train, 1910 English adaptation of the operetta Die geschiedene Frau
 The Girl in the Pullman, a 1927 silent American film